Udjebten or Wedjebten was an ancient Egyptian queen consort, a wife of Pharaoh Pepi II of the Sixth Dynasty.

Titles
Her titles include that of Hereditary Princess (ỉrỉỉ.t-pˁt), which indicates she was of noble birth.

All other titles known for Wedjebten are related to her role as wife of the king: She who sees Horus and Seth (m33.t-ḥrw-stš), Great one of the hetes-sceptre (wr.t-ḥts), King’s Wife (ḥm.t-nỉswt), Beloved King’s Wife of Men-ankh-Neferkare (ḥm.t-nỉswt mrỉỉ.t=f mn-ˁnḫ-nfr-k3-rˁ), Attendant of Horus (ḫt-ḥrw), Consort of the Beloved of the Two Ladies (zm3.t mrỉỉ-nb.tỉ).

None of her titles state that she was a King's Daughter, so she may not have been a sister to pharaoh Pepi II like his other wives Neith and Iput II.

Burial
Wedjebten was buried in a pyramid in Saqqara. Her pyramid complex included a pyramid, a small mortuary temple and a cult pyramid. Wedjebten's complex was surrounded by two perimeter walls. An inscription found at the sites mentions that the top of Wedjebten's pyramid was encased in gold. The walls of her burial chamber were lined with a set of Pyramid Texts.

References

Further reading
Gustave Jéquier, La Pyramide d'Oudjebten, 1928.

23rd-century BC women
22nd-century BC women
Queens consort of the Sixth Dynasty of Egypt
Pepi II Neferkare